Saruhanlı is a town and district of Manisa Province in the Aegean region of Turkey. According to the 2000 census, population of the district is 68,134 of which 13,025 live in the town of Saruhanlı.

Agriculture 
Olive, walnut and almond cultivation is among the important agricultural activities of Saruhanlı.

Notes

References

External links
 District governor's official website 
 Road map of Saruhanlı and environs

Populated places in Manisa Province